Lars Skjeset (born 1 March  1983) is a Norwegian orienteering competitor, and medal winner from World Games, European Championships and  Junior World Championships. He represents the club Frol IL of Levanger.

Junior career
Skjeset participated at the Junior World Orienteering Championships in Põlva in 2003, where he won a silver medal in the relay, together with Kristian Dalby and Audun Weltzien.

Senior career
Skjeset received a bronze medal in relay at the European Orienteering Championships in 2006 in Otepää, together with Carl Waaler Kaas and Øystein Kvaal Østerbø. At the 2008 European Championships in Ventspils he finished 5th in the sprint. He participated at the World Games in 2009, obtaining a bronze medal in the mixed relay.

References

External links

1983 births
Living people
Norwegian orienteers
Male orienteers
Foot orienteers
World Games bronze medalists
Competitors at the 2009 World Games
World Games medalists in orienteering
21st-century Norwegian people
Junior World Orienteering Championships medalists